The 1928 Linlithgowshire by-election was held on 4 April 1928.  The by-election was held due to the death of the incumbent Conservative MP, James Kidd.  It was won by the Labour candidate Emanuel Shinwell.

References

1928 in Scotland
1920s elections in Scotland
Politics of West Lothian
1928 elections in the United Kingdom
By-elections to the Parliament of the United Kingdom in Scottish constituencies
April 1928 events